Sampda Sharma, better known by her stage name Samsaya, is a Norwegian singer and actress of Indian descent.

Early life
Samsaya was born Sampda Sharma in Hamirpur to an Indian mother, Aruna Sharma, in the northern Indian state of Himachal Pradesh. She lived in India with her family and moved to Norway at the age of only eleven months. She grew up on Ellingsrud in Oslo and went to Ellingsrudåsen skole and played football.

Growing up she was influenced by Hip-hop and listened to Public Enemy. She appeared with her first band at the age of nineteen. After several years of making music with other urban musicians in Oslo, she got her breakthrough as an actress in the Norwegian movies, Folk flest bor i Kina, the horror movie Villmark and Hawaii Oslo.

Career

Music
In 2004 she released her debut album Shedding Skin. She also released a video of the hit track "Ever been had?". After touring Norway, she took a break, and a couple of years later she set off to New York City. After spending a year in New York, she launched her single "Special blend" by Prayon, in collaboration with Levi's Norway.

In 2008 she released a new single called "Change", produced by Andre Lindal and Geir Hvidsten, which went to second place on the Norwegian singles chart, VG-lista. She was then signed to Bonnier Amigo, the same record label as Madcon, Paperboys and Mira Craig.

Her track "Dodge it" (Eve Nelson/Samsaya) was used in the Oscar-nominated movie The Wrestler. In 2009 she released the two singles "Money" produced by Jarl Aanestad and co-produced by Andre Lindal and "ADHD" produced by Jarl Aanestad.

Samsaya released her single "Stereotype" from the upcoming album Bombay Calling, produced by Roc Nation-producer Fred Ball. She has also signed a worldwide deal with BMG Chrysalis.

In 2012 she collaborated with fellow Norwegian Bertine Zetlitz on the song and video "Electric Feet".

Movies and television
Samsaya has had several roles in Norwegian movies. She has also been on several Norwegian shows on television and radio. In 2008 Samsaya was a VJ on the program Topp 10 on the TV Music Channel The Voice TV Norway. The popular show was seen by Norwegian teenagers on weekdays.

In 2009, Samsaya has been on the front cover of magazines such as Henne and TV shows such as the Norwegian version of The Clash of the Choirs, 4-stjerners middag halv åtte on TV Norge and Zebra Grand Prix on TV2.

Discography

Albums
2015: Bombay Calling
2004: Shedding skin

Singles

Soundtrack
2008; "Dodge it" (Nelson / Samsaya) (Soundtrack from The Wrestler)

Selected filmography

References

External links
 Samsaya's official Website and Blog
 Samsaya's official Youtube Channel
 Samsaya on Twitter
 Samsaya at Myspace

1979 births
Living people
Norwegian Hindus
Norwegian people of Indian descent
Norwegian film actresses
Norwegian pop singers
Norwegian television presenters
Indian emigrants to Norway
Singers from Himachal Pradesh
People from Hamirpur district, Himachal Pradesh
Women musicians from Himachal Pradesh
21st-century Norwegian singers
21st-century Norwegian women singers
Norwegian women television presenters